Predator Gaming is a gamer-focused brand and line of computer hardware owned by Acer. In 2008, Acer introduced itself in the gaming computer market with a line of desktop computers: the Acer Aspire Predator series, later renamed as Acer Predator. The series is characterized by the futuristic computer chassis and high performance. In 2016, a complete range of Predator desktops, gaming laptops, tablets and accessories exists.

The range competes with Lenovo's Legion, Dell's G series and Alienware subsidiary, HP's Omen and Asus ROG series.

Laptops

Specifications

Predator Helios 300

Predator Helios 300 Special Edition

Predator Helios 500

Predator Triton 500 

Acer's first entry into the "Thin and light gaming laptop" Series

Predator Triton 700

Predator Triton 900

Predator 21 X 

Acer's 9000$ range gaming laptop that run's as powerful as a desktop with 2 nvidia gtx 1080's in sli. It comes with 64gb of ram memory and 1tb of ssd

Desktops

AG3620 (2012)
AG5900 (2010)
AG7200
AG7700 (2009)
AG7710 (2009)
AG7711
AG7712
AG7713
AG7750 (2010)
AG3-710-UR53
AG3-710-UR54
AG6-710-70001
AG6-710-70002
AG6-710-70004

Specifications

Monitors

Specifications

References

External links
Official website
Predator Gaming - It Lies Within
Acer Predator Helios 300 Review

Acer Inc. products
Consumer electronics brands
Acer Inc. laptops
Gaming computers